Gustav Grubbe Madsen (born 27 January 2003) is a Danish footballer currently playing as a full back for OB.

Career statistics

Club

Notes

References

2003 births
Living people
Danish men's footballers
Danish expatriate men's footballers
Denmark youth international footballers
Association football defenders
Danish Superliga players
Odense Boldklub players
RB Leipzig players
Danish expatriate sportspeople in Germany
Expatriate footballers in Germany